Exilisia tripuncta is a moth of the subfamily Arctiinae. It was described by Sergius G. Kiriakoff in 1958. It is found on Uganda.

References

 

Endemic fauna of Uganda
Lithosiini
Moths described in 1958